Suillus chiapasensis is a species of bolete fungus in the family Suillaceae. Found in Mexico, it was described as new to science in 1973 by mycologist Rolf Singer. The type collection was made in Chiapas, west of San Cristóbal de las Casas, on 2 August 1969.

See also
List of North American boletes

References

External links

chiapasensis
Fungi of Mexico
Fungi described in 1973
Fungi without expected TNC conservation status